Hyalurga padua is a moth of the family Erebidae. It was described by Herbert Druce in 1893. It is found in Ecuador.

References

 

Hyalurga
Moths described in 1893